Suluada is a Mediterranean island of Turkey. The name Suluada is a composite word meaning "watery island" referring to fresh water sources of the island. In the antiquity the island was called "Krambusa".

Administratively, it is a part of Kumluca ilçe (district) of Antalya Province at   The island is long and narrow where the -long dimension points to northwest.

Daily excursions to Suluada from Antalya coast are being organized everyday between March and November. Island is also known as Turkish Maldives.

References

External links
Suluada
Suluada

Mediterranean islands
Islands of Turkey
Kumluca District
Islands of Antalya Province